Piemonte Volley, known for sponsorship reasons as Bre Banca Lannutti Cuneo, is an Italian professional volleyball club based in Cuneo. The club was founded in 1958 under the name of Cuneo Volley Ball Club and renamed Piemonte Volley in 2001, after the acquisition of glorious but long-ailing CUS Torino Pallavolo.

Famous players
 Vladimir Grbić 
 Andrea Anastasi 
 Michele Baranowicz 
  Michał Łasko 
 Gabriele Maruotti  
 Giba
 Vladimir Nikolov
 Tsvetan Sokolov
 Javier González
 Hubert Henno 
 Earvin N'Gapeth
 Antonin Rouzier 
 Guillaume Samica 
  Oleg Antonov
 Ruslan Olikhver
 Aleksandr Volkov
 Emanuel Kohut
 Rafael Pascual
 Wout Wijsmans
Lyubomir Ganev

Achievements
 Italian Volleyball League: 1
 Italian Volleyball Cup: 4
 Italian Volleyball SuperCup: 3
 CEV Cup Winner's Cup: 2
 CEV Cup: 2
 CEV SuperCup: 2

References

Italian volleyball clubs